Brandon Smith (born August 21, 1984) is a former professional Canadian football defensive back. He was signed by the San Jose SaberCats as an undrafted free agent in 2007. He played college football at Sacramento State. He played for the San Jose SaberCats of the Arena Football League and the Calgary Stampeders of the Canadian Football League.

External links
Calgary Stampeders bio 

1984 births
Living people
American players of Canadian football
Calgary Stampeders players
Canadian football defensive backs
American football defensive backs
Players of American football from Oakland, California
Sacramento State Hornets football players
San Jose SaberCats players
Players of Canadian football from Oakland, California